Cedar Creek State Park is sited on  along Cedar Creek in Gilmer County, West Virginia, located about  south of Glenville.  Two of the buildings at the park are historical restorations of West Virginia's pioneer days, including a log cabin now used as the campground check-in station, and the Pine Run One Room School, an old one-room schoolhouse complete with restored school desks and potbellied stove.  The schoolhouse is open for tours on Saturdays in the summer.

Features 
 65 camping sites featuring water and electric (no full hookups)
 2 Dump Stations are available at the camp office
 Swimming pool
 Picnic area with shelters
 3 fishing lakes
 Paddleboat rentals
 Miniature golf
 Camp store

Accessibility
Accessibility for the disabled was assessed by West Virginia University. The assessment Cedar Creek State Park to be generally accessible. The 2005 evaluation found issues regarding signage in a parking lot, and also found that assistance may be needed to access the ramp to the swimming pool and a pond.

See also
List of West Virginia state parks
State park

References

External links 
 

State parks of West Virginia
Education museums in the United States
Protected areas established in 1955
History museums in West Virginia
Museums in Gilmer County, West Virginia
Protected areas of Gilmer County, West Virginia
Campgrounds in West Virginia
IUCN Category III
1955 establishments in West Virginia